Piz Muraun is a mountain of the Swiss Lepontine Alps, located near Disentis in the canton of Graubünden. It lies between the Val Medel and the Val Sumvitg.

References

External links
 Piz Muraun on Hikr

Mountains of Graubünden
Mountains of the Alps
Lepontine Alps
Mountains of Switzerland
Two-thousanders of Switzerland
Sumvitg